Augustin Bea, S.J. (28 May 1881 – 16 November 1968), was a German Jesuit priest, cardinal, and scholar at the Pontifical Gregorian University, specialising in biblical studies and biblical archaeology. He also served as the personal confessor of Pope Pius XII.

He was made a cardinal in 1959 by Pope John XXIII and served as the first president of the Secretariat for Promoting Christian Unity from 1960 until his death. Bea was a leading biblical scholar and ecumenist, who greatly influenced Christian-Jewish relations during the Second Vatican Council in Nostra aetate. Bea published several books, mostly in Latin, and 430 articles.

Biography

Early life and education
Bea was born in Riedböhringen, today a part of Blumberg, Baden-Württemberg; his father was a carpenter. He studied at the universities of Freiburg, Innsbruck, Berlin, and at Valkenburg, the Jesuit house of studies in the Netherlands. On 18 April 1902, he joined the Society of Jesus, as he "was much inclined to the scholarly life". Bea was ordained a priest on 25 August 1912, and finished his studies in 1914.

Priestly ministry
Bea served as superior of the Jesuit residence in Aachen until 1917, at which time he began teaching Scripture at Valkenburg. From 1921 to 1924, Bea was the provincial superior of Germany. Superior General Wlodimir Ledóchowski then sent him to Rome, where he worked as the superior of the Biennial House of Formation (1924–1928), professor at the Pontifical Biblical Institute (1924–1949), and rector of the Institute of Superior Ecclesiastical Studies (1924–1930). In 1930, Bea was named rector of the Pontifical Biblical Institute, a post in which he remained for nineteen years.

Consistory and episcopal ministry
Raised to the rank of cardinal before his episcopal consecration, Bea was created Cardinal-Deacon of S. Saba by Pope John XXIII in the consistory of 14 December 1959. On 6 June 1960, he was appointed the first president of the newly formed Secretariat for Promoting Christian Unity, a Curial organisation charged with ecumenical affairs. It was not until two years later that, on 5 April 1962, Cardinal Bea was appointed a bishop: the Titular Archbishop of Germania in Numidia. He received his consecration on the following 19 April from John XXIII himself, with Cardinals Giuseppe Pizzardo and Benedetto Aloisi Masella serving as co-consecrators, in the Lateran Basilica. He resigned his post as titular archbishop in 1963, one year after the Second Vatican Council was convened.

Cardinal Bea was one of the electors in the 1963 papal conclave which elected Pope Paul VI, and was confirmed as the president of the Secretariat for Promoting Christian Unity (renamed the Pontifical Council for Promoting Christian Unity by Pope John Paul II on 28 June 1988) on 3 January 1966.

Cardinal Bea died from a bronchial infection in Rome, at the age of 87. He was buried in the apse of the parish church of Saint Genesius in his native Riedböhringen, where there is a museum honouring him.

Impact and legacy
Bea was highly influential at the Second Vatican Council in the 1960s as a decisive force in the drafting of Nostra aetate, which repudiated anti-Semitism. In 1963, he held secret talks with Abraham Joshua Heschel, promoting Catholic–Jewish dialogue. John Borelli, a Vatican II historian, has observed that, "It took the will of John XXIII and the perseverance of Cardinal Bea to impose the declaration on the Council". During a session of the Central Preparatory Commission, he also rejected the proposition that the Council Fathers take an oath composed of the Nicene Creed and the anti-modernist oath. After Alfredo Ottaviani, the heavily conservative head of the Holy Office, presented his draft of the schema on the sources of Divine Revelation, Bea claimed that it "would close the door to intellectual Europe and the outstretched hands of friendship in the old and new world". He served on numerous ecumenical bodies and was the author of nine works, including The Church and the Jewish People (New York: Harper & Row, 1966).

Bea was a confessor to Pope Pius XII from 1945 until Pius's death in 1958. The encyclical Divino afflante Spiritu was very much shaped by Bea and Jacques-Marie Voste, O.P. (secretary of the Pontifical Biblical Commission). According Pecorelli's list, Cardinal Bae had been a member of Freemasonry.

When Pius XII proposed appointing Bea to the College of Cardinals in 1946, Superior General Jean-Baptiste Janssens spoke out against it, as many felt the Holy See was showing preferential treatment to the Jesuits.
He had for some time as his secretary Jesuit priest Malachi Martin. Among his other offices, Bea was a consultor to several Roman congregations.

Poem of the Man God
As confessor to Pope Pius XII, Bea was instrumental in bypassing the Vatican hierarchy to help Father Corrado Berti deliver a copy of the book Poem of the Man-God to Pope Pius XII when Father Berti approached both Bea and Msgr. Alphonso Carinci with a typed copy of the manuscript of Maria Valtorta's writings in 1947. With Bea's assistance the manuscript was thus delivered to Pius XII and Father Berti and Father Migliorini were granted a papal audience. However, Bea was also a consultor of the Holy Office at the time it condemned the book, as was Dominican theologian Reginald Garrigou-Lagrange.

Awards
  Bavarian Order of Merit
  1954 Grand Cross of Merit of the Federal Republic of Germany
  Grand Cross of the French Legion of Honour
  Grand Cross of the Greek Order of George I
  1960 Grand Cross of Merit of the Federal Republic of Germany
1965 International Prize for the brotherhood of the Fellowship Commission (International Fellowship Award), Philadelphia, Pennsylvania, US
1966 Peace Prize of the German Book Trade, along with Willem Visser 't Hooft
1967 Human Relations Award for the Society for Family of Man (New York)

Published works
Augustin Bea published 430 articles in the years 1918–1968. They dealt with archaeological issues, exegesis of Old Testament texts, Mariology, papal encyclicals, the unity of Christians, anti-Semitism, Vatican II, relations to Protestantism and the eastern Orthodox Churches, and ecumenicism.

Among his books:
  Hugo Rahner and Augustin Bea, Schöningh, Paderborn, 1947
 , Buenos Aires, Revista Biblica, 1954
 , Romae, 1933
 , Romae, 1935
 , Romae, 1939
 , Romae 1946
 , Romae, 1950
 , Romae, 1953
 , Herder Freiburg, 1959
  (German translation of ), Herder Freiburg, 1966

References

Further reading 
 Malachi Martin: Three Popes and the Cardinal, Farrar, Straus and Giroux, New York, 1972, 
 Stjepan Schmidt: Augustin Cardinal Bea: Spiritual Profile (notes from the Cardinal's diary), London, Geoffrey Chapman, 1971, 298pp.
 Stjepan Schmidt: Augustin Bea, The Cardinal of Unity, New-York, 1992.
 Saretta Marotta, La genesi di un ecumenista: la corrispondenza tra Augustin Bea e il vescovo di Paderborn Lorenz Jaeger (1951-1960), in Toward a History of the Desire for Christian Unity. Proceedings of the International Conference at the Monastery of Bose, Lit Verlag 2015, pp. 159–191.
 S. Marotta, Ökumene von Unten': Augustin Bea di fronte alle attività del movimento, Una Sancta' in «Cristianesimo nella storia» (2016), pp. 541–611.
 S. Marotta, Augustin Bea auf dem Weg zum Ökumeniker, in "Zeitschrift für Kirchengeschichte", 2016/3.

External links
 Augustine Bea at the Catholic Hierarchy
 Cardinals of the Holy Roman Church
 

1881 births
1968 deaths
20th-century German cardinals
20th-century German Jesuits
People from Schwarzwald-Baar-Kreis
Participants in the Second Vatican Council
Pope Pius XII advisers
Grand Crosses 1st class of the Order of Merit of the Federal Republic of Germany
Grand Croix of the Légion d'honneur
Grand Crosses of the Order of George I
Cardinals created by Pope John XXIII
German biblical scholars
Old Testament scholars
Academic staff of the Pontifical Biblical Institute
Jesuit cardinals